Santo Antônio do Paraíso (Portuguese meaning "Saint Anthony of paradise") is a municipality of the state of Paraná, Brazil. The population is 2,068 (2020 est.) in an area of 165.90 km2.

References

External links
http://www.citybrazil.com.br/rs/stoantonioparaiso/ 

Municipalities in Paraná